The Kaivalyadhama Health and Yoga Research Center (abbreviated Kaivalyadhama), founded by Swami Kuvalayananda in 1924, is a spiritual, therapeutic, and research center with a specific aim to coordinate ancient yogic arts and tradition with modern science; he founded the journal Yoga Mimamsa at the same time. Kaivalyadhama is located in Lonavla, Maharashtra, India, with smaller branches elsewhere in India, France, and the United States.

Kaivalyadhama performs scientific and philosophico-literary research as well as provides Yogic and Ayurvedic healthcare and education.

It also houses a Naturopathy center and hosts some 250 students per year for its various courses. Students come from India and abroad, primarily from China, Japan, Korea, France, United States, and Canada.

Kaivalyadhama is a public charitable trust which receives some funding from the Government of India.

History
Kaivalyadhama was established in 1924 by Swami Kuvalayananda in Lonavla, Maharashtra, India. Swami Kuvalayananda led the facility, which was primarily used to further his scientific research into the yogic arts, until his death in 1966.

Kaivalyadhama publishes the quarterly Yoga Mimamsa journal; Swami Kuvalayananda founded it in 1924.

In 1944, the Philosophico-Literary Research Department was created in order to explore the interpretation and translation of traditional yogic texts.

To help train others in the theoretical and practical aspects of yoga, the Gordhandhas Seksaria College Of Yoga and Cultural Synthesis was opened in 1951. The College was named after Gordhandas Seksaria, the father of donor Sheth Makhanlal Gordhandas Seksaria, a philanthropist and industrialist. Shri B. G. Kher, the then Chief Minister of Bombay State, formally inaugurated the college in October 1951. The first convocation was held in May 1953 where Shri H.V. Divetia, Vice-Chancellor of Gujarat University, delivered the convocational address.

In 1962, Kaivalyadhama was declared an "All India Institute of Higher Education" by India's Ministry of Education.

In 2004, India's Human Resource Development Ministry affirmed it as a national resource center for the introduction of yoga in schools.

In 2019 the Government of India's Yoga Certification Board under the Ministry of AYUSH declared Kaivalyadhama a "Leading Yoga Institution".

Facility

Kaivalyadhama sits on 180 acres of lush forest on the edge of Lonavla, Maharashtra, India. The campus consists of eight primary buildings which house its five departments:  Scientific Research, Philosophical-Literary Research, Gordhandas Seksaria College of Yoga and Cultural Synthesis, Central Administration, and the Shrimati Amolak Devi Tirathram Gupta Yogic Hospital and Health Care Center. In addition, several buildings house students and visiting staff. Kaivalyadhama can house up to 150 students at a time.

Two kitchens serve daily Ayurvedic meals for students, faculty, and staff, often using locally grown rice and on-site cows for milk. Meals are strictly vegetarian. A naturopathy center provides herbal massage and steam-bath treatments for patients and visitors. Extensive Ayurvedic gardens provide many of the naturopathic remedies.  Several smaller buildings provide classroom spaces for asanas and lectures.

The Gupta Yogic Hospital and Health Care Center provides treatment facilities utilizing yoga, naturopathy and Ayurveda. It is open to both indoor and outdoor patients. For individuals who suffer from specific ailments, a tailor-made programme is designed with the most appropriate treatment prescribed. A resident medical officer and visiting Ayurvedic physicians provide care and consultations. There are also facilities to handle the disabled and elderly.

Degrees and programs
The Gordhandhas Seksaria College Of Yoga and Cultural Synthesis at Kaivalyadhama  grants degrees, diplomas and certificates for several specializations. There are a total of seven courses for yoga students, yoga teachers, academics, students of Ayurveda, medical professionals, and school teachers.
 Bachelor in Yoga
 Diploma in Yoga Education
 Diploma in Yoga Therapy
 Certificate Course in Yoga
 Certificate in Introduction to Yoga and Ayurveda
 Certificate in Introduction to Traditional Texts of Yoga
 Reorientation Programme for Medical Professionals
 Orientation Programme for School Teachers

Faculty
Kaivalyadhama has 18 full-time faculty members whose specialties includes the areas of study of ancient Sanskrit texts and manuscripts of yoga, psychology, philosophy, yoga practice and teaching methodology, yogic therapy and counseling, anatomy and physiology, and Ayurveda,

References

External links
 Official Website
 Online Class Site
 YouTube Channel
 Affiliated School

 

Yoga schools
Spiritual retreats
Ayurvedic organisations
Naturopathy
Research institutes in Pune
Schools in Pune
Educational institutions established in 1924
Medknow Publications academic journals
1924 establishments in India